King Chulalongkorn Memorial Hospital (KCMH,) is a public general and tertiary referral hospital in Bangkok, Thailand. It is operated by the Thai Red Cross Society, and serves as the teaching hospital for the Faculty of Medicine, Chulalongkorn University and Srisavarindhira Thai Red Cross Institute of Nursing. With an in-patient capacity of 1,435 beds, it is one of the largest hospitals in Thailand, and as one of Thailand's leading medical school affiliates, is widely considered one of the best public hospitals in the country, along with Siriraj Hospital and Ramathibodi Hospital.

History
The founding of the hospital was first proposed by King Vajiravudh, who, having observed the operations of the Red Cross Hospital of Japan during his travels, thought it beneficial to establish a hospital in the service of the Red Cross (then the Red Unalom Society). The hospital, named in honour of King Chulalongkorn, was founded through donations by King Vajiravudh and his brothers and sisters, together with the society's funds. The hospital was opened by King Vajiravudh on 30 May 1914.

King Ananda Mahidol aimed to increase physician in Thailand because at that time Thailand is under post–World War II period. Government of Thailand intentionally tried to find another hospital which is ready to be the second medical school of Thailand and finally they should King Chulalongkorn Memorial Hospital of the Thai Red Cross Society. On 4 June 1947, Affiliation with Faculty of Medicine, Chulalongkorn University was established.

Facilities
Today, the hospital provides general and specialized medical services through its dentistry, forensic medicine, internal medicine, orthopedics, pediatrics, preventive medicine, psychiatry, obstetrics and gynecology, ophthalmology, otolaryngology, radiology and surgery clinics. It also operates five specialized medical service centers, namely: Cardiac Center, Glaucoma Imaging & Diagnostic Center, Excimer Laser Center, Chulalongkorn Craniofacial Center, and the Queen Sirikit Center for Breast Cancer. It serves as the office of many WHO Collaborating Centres in Thailand.

In 2007, ground was broken for the hospital's Bhumisirimangkalanusorn Building — claimed to be the largest medical hub in ASEAN — is a 12.5-billion baht (US$376 million) 29-storey facility. It was jointly financed by the state and the Thai Red Cross Society. The new addition opened on a partial basis in 2016 and is due to be fully inaugurated by the end of 2017. It has over 1,250 beds. Fully operational, it will house over 1,600 physicians and 2,100 nurses.

See also
Faculty of Medicine, Chulalongkorn University 
Hospitals in Thailand
List of hospitals in Thailand

References

External links
 

Hospital buildings completed in 1914
Hospitals in Bangkok
Teaching hospitals in Thailand
Hospitals established in 1914
Pathum Wan district
Monuments and memorials to Chulalongkorn
Thai Red Cross Society